Danny Alberto Osorio Calle (born 24 June 1988) is a Colombian road cyclist, who currently rides for UCI Continental team .

Major results

2013
 5th Overall Vuelta a Ecuador
 5th Overall Clásico RCN
2014
 3rd Overall Clásico RCN
 6th Overall Vuelta a Colombia
2015
 4th Overall 
1st Mountains classification
2016
 2nd Overall Vuelta a Antioquia
2017
 1st  Overall Vuelta a Antioquia
1st Stage 5 (ITT)
 2nd Overall 
1st Sprints classification
1st Stage 1
 2nd Overall 
 3rd Overall Clásico RCN
 3rd Overall 
 10th Overall Vuelta a Colombia
2018
 1st Stage 2 
 9th Overall Colombia Oro y Paz
2019
 1st Stage 2 
2020
 2nd Overall Vuelta a Antioquia
 4th Overall Vuelta a Colombia
2021
 1st Stage 1 Vuelta al Gran Santander
 3rd Overall Vuelta al Táchira
 4th Overall Vuelta a Colombia

References

External links

1988 births
Living people
Colombian male cyclists
20th-century Colombian people
21st-century Colombian people
Sportspeople from Antioquia Department